The Food Allergen Labeling and Consumer Protection Act (FALCPA) is a United States law that requires all food labels in the United States to list ingredients that may cause allergic reactions and was effective as of January 1, 2006. While many ingredients can trigger a food allergy, this legislation only specifies the eight major food allergens. This law was passed largely due to the efforts of organizations such as the Food Allergy & Anaphylaxis Network (FAAN). 

The purpose of this act was to prevent manufacturers from using misleading, uncommon, or confusing methods to label their ingredients. Someone shopping for a friend with a soy allergy might not know that lecithin is derived from soy. Now it must be labeled "lecithin (soy)" to help prevent consumers from consuming allergens.

Eight "major" food allergens 

This law is in regard to the eight most common food allergens. These affect the most people and the proteins are commonly found in other ingredients. They account for about 90% of food allergies. The main eight are:

 Milk – A milk allergy is different from lactose intolerance in that the reaction is caused typically by casein, a protein found in milk.
 Eggs
 Fish
 Crustacean shellfish
 Tree nuts
 Peanuts – Not everyone who is allergic to peanuts is also allergic to tree nuts, or vice versa, as peanuts are actually a legume.
 Wheat
 Soybeans

Any ingredient which contains proteins derived from these allergens must also be listed. 
The specific type of nut, fish, or shellfish must be listed (e.g. walnut, catfish, blue crab). 
Even minute amounts, such as coloring or spices, must be listed if they contain any proteins from these major allergens.

Manufacturers are given two ways in which to label food allergens. They may either state the food source name of a major food allergen in the list of ingredients, most often contained within parenthesis. (e.g. Casein (milk)) or they could instead use the word "contains" in the label, such as "contains peanuts".

They can choose either method, as long as it is clearly written. If they choose the second method and say an ingredient "contains" the allergen, they must be sure to list all allergens contained, such as by saying "contains pecans and soy".

References 

 H. Lemon-Mule, T.J. Furlong,S.H. Sicherer. Journal of Allergy and Clinical Immunology. Volume 119, Issue 1, Supplement, January 2007, Pages S74.

External links
 Food Allergen Labeling and Consumer Protection Act of 2004 as enacted (details) in the US Statutes at Large

Consumer protection in the United States
United States federal health legislation